Fairhaven is a 2012 American comedy film written and directed by Tom O'Brien. The film stars Sarah Paulson, Chris Messina, Rich Sommer, Alexie Gilmore, Natalie Gold and Maryann Plunkett. The film was released on January 11, 2013, by Starz Digital.

Cast
Sarah Paulson as Kate
Chris Messina as Dave
Rich Sommer as Sam
Alexie Gilmore as Angela
Natalie Gold as Jill
Maryann Plunkett as Maddy
Tom O'Brien as Jon
Georgia Lyman as Sara
Paul O'Brien as Gary
Tim Haber as Chet 
Phyllis Kay as Dave's Mom 
Alicia Racine as Stacy

Release
The film premiered at the Tribeca Film Festival on April 20, 2012. The film was released on January 11, 2013, by Starz Digital.

References

External links
 

2012 films
2012 comedy films
American comedy films
2010s English-language films
2010s American films